The Crapemyrtle Aphid, (Tinocallis kahawaluokalani), also known as Sarucallis (Tinocallis) kahawaluokalani, is an aphid in the superfamily Aphidoidea in the order Hemiptera. It is a true bug and sucks sap from plants. It is most invasive aphids known from Crape myrtle. They were first discovered from Hawaii.

References 

 http://animaldiversity.org/accounts/Tinocallis_kahawaluokalani/classification/
 http://edis.ifas.ufl.edu/in663
 http://www.nbair.res.in/Aphids/Tinocallis kahawaluokalani.php
 http://aphid.speciesfile.org/Common/basic/Taxa.aspx?TaxonNameID=1160222
 http://content.ces.ncsu.edu/crapemyrtle-aphid-sarucallis-tinocallis-kahawaluokalani/

Agricultural pest insects
Insects of Hawaii
Panaphidini